Sérgio Roberto Veloso de Oliveira (born Recife, 16 February 1969), known as Siba, is a popular Brazilian folk-rock singer and songwriter. Sergio Veloso, or Siba, founded the band Mestre Ambrósio which was popular in the 1990s. After 2000 he turned to folk music with the band Fuloresta, backed by traditional brass musicians, and then in the late 2000s to experimental and electric music with Avante (2012). In 2015 Siba returned to more political themes with De Baile Solto. His album Coruja Muda was considered one of the 25 best Brazilian albums of the second half of 2019 by the São Paulo Association of Art Critics.

Discography
with band Mestre Ambrósio
1996 - Mestre Ambrósio
1997 - :pt:Fuá na casa de Cabral
1999 - :pt:Baião de Viramundo - Tributo a Luiz Gonzaga
1999 - Songbook de Chico Buarque
2001 - :pt:Terceiro Samba

Solo and collaboration
 2002 - Fuloresta Fuloresta do Samba 
 2003 - Barachinha No Baque Solto Somente
 2007 - Fuloresta Toda Vez Que eu Dou Um Passo o Mundo Sai do Lugar
 2009 - Fuloresta Canoa Furada (EP)
 2009 - Roberto Corrêa "Violas de Bronze" 
 2012 - Siba Avante 
 2015 - Siba De Baile Solto

References

1969 births
Living people